Valeri Andreyevich Tkachuk (born 18 September 1963) is a retired Russian professional footballer and football coach.

He was pupil of the Sports school of FC  Kvant  Obninsk, the first coach —  .

References

External links
 
 

1963 births
Living people
Sportspeople from Kaluga Oblast
Soviet footballers
Association football midfielders
Soviet expatriate footballers
Russian footballers
Russian expatriate footballers
Expatriate footballers in Ukraine
Expatriate footballers in Morocco
Ukrainian Premier League players
Fath Union Sport players
FC Metalurh Zaporizhzhia players
FC Lokomotiv Kaluga players
Russian football managers